Five Desperate Women is a 1971 American TV film directed by Ted Post. It was an ABC Movie of the Week.

Plot
A violent inmate, whose face is not shown, escapes from a state mental facility. He makes his way to a private beach, drowns a man relaxing on the shore, and steals his work uniform.

Five young women reunite, they are having their 5-year college reunion at an exclusive cottage on an isolated island that does not have phone contact with the mainland. Several of the women have personal issues.

Meeker is the captain of the small boat that takes the women to the island. Wylie is the island's caretaker. They argue, both with the women around and in private.

The next morning the island's dog is found dead. Later that day four of the women return from the beach to discover that the fifth has been strangled to death. They surmise it must be Meeker or Wylie who killed her. The women plan to get on the boat and sail off, or at least to use its radio to call for help, but as they approach the boat it explodes.

The four women lock the men out of the cottage and agree to not leave each other alone for the rest of the night. The men, when told (through the locked door) that one of the women has been killed, both say they have no knowledge of it. They tell the women a supply ship will be arriving in the morning, and leave them in the mansion. The women discuss which of Meeker or Wylie they think is the murderer.

In the company cabin, the two men are suspicious of each other and both resolve not to let the other out of his sight. They discuss the possibility that someone else might be on the island. Later that night Meeker says he wants to go out to get some air, and when Wylie tries to stop him, they fight. Meeker beats up Wylie and runs away.

The next morning Meeker and Wylie have a confrontation that reveals Wylie is the murderer. Wylie then kills Meeker and subsequently persuades the women that Meeker was responsible, and that they are all now safe. Later, when the supply ship is due, one of the women goes off to thank Wylie for his help. The other women wander the beach while waiting, and come across information that proves Wylie, the man they have come to trust, is the actual killer. They rush off to warn their friend.

The lone woman, while talking to Wylie comes to the realization that he is unbalanced. Just then the three women approach calling out her name. She runs off but he catches her and chokes her. Her friends, after at first being fearful of getting too close to the attack, are able to save her by knocking Wylie over the head with a rock, which kills him. Gasping and in shock they make their way to the island's pier.

Cast
Anjanette Comer as Lucy
Bradford Dillman as Jim Meeker
Joan Hackett as Dorian
Denise Nicholas as Joy
Stefanie Powers as Gloria
Julie Sommars as Mary Grace
Robert Conrad as Wylie
Connie Sawyer as Mrs Brown
Beatrice Manley as Mrs Miller

References

External links

1971 films
1971 television films
ABC Movie of the Week
Films directed by Ted Post